Edward J. "Ned" Carew (16 March 1924 – 23 July 1997) was an Irish hurler who played as a midfielder for the Waterford senior team.

Born in Ferrybank, County Waterford, Carew first played competitive hurling in his youth. He subsequently became a regular member of the starting fifteen of the Waterford senior team and won one All-Ireland medal and one Munster medal.

As a member of the Munster inter-provincial team on a number of occasions, Carew won one Railway Cup medal. At club level he won several championship medals with Ferrybank and Erin's Own.

Honours

Waterford
All-Ireland Senior Hurling Championship (1): 1948
Munster Senior Hurling Championship (1): 1948

Munster
Railway Cup (1): 1949

References

1924 births
1997 deaths
CIÉ people
Ferrybank hurlers
Erin's Own (Waterford) hurlers
Waterford inter-county hurlers
Munster inter-provincial hurlers
All-Ireland Senior Hurling Championship winners